A list of American films released in 1939.

Gone with the Wind won the Academy Award for Best Picture.

#

A–B

C–D

E–F

G–H

I–J

K–L

M–N

O–R

S–T

U–Z

See also
 1939 in the United States

References

External links

 1939 films at the Internet Movie Database

1939
Films
Lists of 1939 films by country or language